Corey Thompson (born 15 May 1990) is an Australian former professional rugby league footballer who plays as a er and  for the Brisbane Tigers in the Queensland Cup. 

He previously played for the Canterbury-Bankstown Bulldogs, Wests Tigers and the Gold Coast Titans in the National Rugby League, and the Widnes Vikings in the Super League.

Background
Thompson was born in Brisbane, Queensland, Australia, and is an Indigenous Australian.

He played his junior football for Easts Mount Gravatt, before joining the Souths Logan Magpies.

Playing career

Early career
In 2010 and 2011, Thompson played for the Souths Logan Magpies in the Queensland Cup. In 2012, he joined the Eastern Suburbs Tigers, giving him the chance to do a pre-season with National Rugby League team Melbourne Storm. The Storm attempted to sign Thompson but couldn't fit him under their salary cap. In 2013, he played games for ICONZ Rugby in an Australian Rugby sevens tournament. In April 2013, while playing for the Eastern Suburbs Tigers, he signed a 2-year contract with the Canterbury-Bankstown Bulldogs starting effective immediately.

2014
In Round 1, Thompson made his NRL debut for Canterbury-Bankstown against the Brisbane Broncos. In September, Thompson re-signed with Canterbury on a 1-year contract.  Thompson made a total of 25 appearances for Canterbury in 2014 including the 2014 NRL Grand Final which the club lost 30-6 against South Sydney at ANZ Stadium.

2015
On 16 August, Thompson signed a 2-year contract with Super League team Widnes.

2016
In the 2016 season. Corey scored 27 tries for the Vikings, meaning he was the second highest try scorer in the league behind Denny Solomona of the Castleford Tigers. Corey helped his team to a 7th-place finish in Super League.

2018
Thompson returned to the NRL with the Wests Tigers. With Tuimoala Lolohea pencilled in as fullback, Thompson was said to being adding "further depth" to the team. However, Thompson was named at fullback for the last trial before the season began, with coach Ivan Cleary saying post-match, "I couldn't have asked for more from him really. He was in everything tonight. Corey's been a standout right throughout the pre-season."

With Lolohea selected at fullback for the round 1, Thompson was chosen on the right wing ahead of regular winger David Nofoaluma. Near the end of the game, he scored a match-winning "freakish try finished with polish" as Wests Tigers defeated the Sydney Roosters 10-8. After Lolohea suffered a knee injury, Thompson was named at fullback for round 2. Described as the, "early contender for bargain buy of the season". Thompson signed an upgraded contract for 2019. He continued to switch between fullback and winger, making 20 straight appearances before a season-ending ankle injury. Despite the premature end, he was the club's leading try-scorer with 9.

2019
In Round 2 of the 2019 NRL season, Thompson scored 2 tries as Wests defeated the New Zealand Warriors 34-6 at Campbelltown Stadium.  In Round 19 against Newcastle, Thompson scored 2 tries as Wests won the match 28-26 at the Newcastle International Sports Centre.

Thompson finished the season making 22 appearances and scoring 9 tries as the club ended the year in 9th spot and missed out on the finals.

2020
On 15 June Thompson signed a three year deal with  the Gold Coast Titans after being granted a immediate release from the Wests Tigers.

References

External links

Wests Tigers profile
NRL profile
Canterbury-Bankstown Bulldogs profile

1990 births
Living people
Australian rugby league players
Australian expatriate sportspeople in England
Canterbury-Bankstown Bulldogs players
Eastern Suburbs Tigers players
Gold Coast Titans players
Indigenous Australian rugby league players
Rugby league fullbacks
Rugby league players from Brisbane
Rugby league wingers
Souths Logan Magpies players
Wests Tigers players
Widnes Vikings players